The Salt Range gecko (Cyrtopodion montiumsalsorum) is a species of gecko, a lizard in the family Gekkonidae. The species is endemic to northern Pakistan.

Geographic range
C. montiumsalsorum is found in the Salt Range of Punjab province, Pakistan. It may also occur in northern India.

Reproduction
C. montiumsalsorum is oviparous.

References

Further reading
Annandale N (1913). "The Indian Geckos of the Genus Gymnodactylus ". Records of the Indian Museum 9: 309-326 + Plates XVI-XVII. (Gymnodactylus montium-salsorum, new species, pp. 313–315 + Plate XVII, figures 1, 1a, 1b, 1c).
Khan MS (1989). "Rediscovery and Redescription of the Highland Ground Gecko, Tenuidactylus montiumsalsorum (Annandale, 1913)". Herpetologica 45 (1): 46–54.
Smith MA (1935). The Fauna of British India, Including Ceylon and Burma. Reptilia and Amphibia. Vol. II.—Sauria. London: Secretary of State for India in Council. (Taylor and Francis, printers), xiii + 440 pp. + Plate I + 2 maps. (Gymnodactylus montium-salsorum, p. 42).

Salt Range gecko
Reptiles of Pakistan
Endemic fauna of Pakistan
Salt Range gecko
Taxa named by Nelson Annandale